Bengt Snivil (also known as Bengt Snivel) from the House of Bjelbo was a Swedish magnate in mid-12th century.

Some more or less romantic later literature has given him the title of jarl, although no proper historical source attests to such. Romantic genealogies assign a lady Sigrid Lakman as his wife, though without historical source.

Arguably, Bengt Snivil was that Bengt or Benedict, who was son of riksjarl Folke the Fat and Ingegerd Knutsdotter of Denmark, daughter of king Canute IV of Denmark.

Children 
Children of Bengt Snivil, who thus became an ancestor of important magnates and the future royal family:

 Riksjarl Birger Brosa
 Magnus Minnesköld, father of Birger Jarl
 Charles the Deaf, father of  father of jarl Ulf Fase

Notes

References 
 

Swedish politicians
12th-century births
Year of death unknown
House of Bjelbo
Swedish jarls